Chislehurst Cricket Club is based in Chislehurst, Kent. Historically the club played several top-class matches in the 18th century. Its home venue was at Chislehurst Common.

History
Chislehurst is first recorded in July 1738 when it played London Cricket Club on Chislehurst Common. A rematch was quickly arranged and took place at the Artillery Ground a week later, with a third match at the same venue played in September.

Chislehurst played London each season from 1738 to 1741. In 1743, a combined Chislehurst and Bromley XI played London in two matches and, in 1746, a combined Chislehurst and London team played Addington.

Today
Cricket is still played on Chislehurst Common as the Chislehurst and West Kent Cricket Club has its ground there on the appropriately named Cricket Ground Road. The club is an amalgamation of two 19th-century clubs. The West Kent Cricket Club was originally based in Bromley but lost its ground in 1821 due to the enclosure of Bromley Common.  The club was rescued by an offer from the Chislehurst authorities to let them establish a new ground on Chislehurst Common.  In 1876, three small local clubs amalgamated and called themselves the Chislehurst Cricket Club and agreement was reached so that the two clubs shared Cricket Ground Road for the next 100 years. West Kent CC was dissolved in 1980 and the Chislehurst club, now known as the Chislehurst and West Kent Cricket Club, has sole use of the ground.

References

Former senior cricket clubs
English cricket teams in the 18th century
Sports clubs established in the 1730s
Cricket in Kent
English club cricket teams
Chislehurst
Cricket teams in London